is a Japanese mecha designer. A member of the studio Sunrise, he worked on the Gundam series as well as his work on video games, such as the Virtual On series and Policenauts.

Biography
Born in 1963, Katoki created designs for the graphic novel Gundam Sentinel. He then worked in the OVA series Gundam 0083, where he designed the majority of the mobile suits in the series, including the RX-78GP03 Gundam Dendrobium Stamen and Orchis mobile weapons. His next prominent work was V Gundam, where he was the main mechanical designer, creating the main mobile suits Victory Gundam, V2 Gundam and the V2 Assault Buster Gundam. After that, he worked on G Gundam, now in design of the antagonist mobile suits. His next work was on Gundam Wing, where most of the enemy mobile suits, including the popular Tallgeese, were designed by him. He also created the mobile suits designs for Gundam Wing: Endless Waltz, and re-designed the Gundams with a more fantastic style, creating  the XXXG-00W0 Wing Gundam Zero EW. To correspond with these new designs, he also redesigned the 5 original Gundams from Gundam Wing.

Katoki also has worked in Super Robot Wars and Virtual On video games, and in the Patlabor 2 movie. He also collaborates quite frequently with Bandai, often doing touch-up designs for the Master Grade model kits and production of the Gundam fix figuration (G.F.F.) series action figures. He is also working with the company to develop a subcategory of the Robot Damashii mecha action figure line, called the Ka Signature line.

In his art book, Gundam Fix, Katoki said: "Do people, like myself, spend time imagining what it would be like if Gundam robots were actually present on the streets of our cities? Are you sure you're not limiting yourself to the images that were offered in the animated series? One of the reasons that I fell in love with Gundam was that it excites me to imagine what it would be like if these machines actually existed, and I worry that other fans may be losing out..." He said he hopes his work will catch peoples' attention"...then people who had never before been drawn in by the magic of these giant robots may discover their attraction for the first time."

Credited series/works

Super Robot Wars series
4th Super Robot Wars
Super Robot Wars Gaiden: Masō Kishin – The Lord Of Elemental
Shin Super Robot Wars
Super Robot Wars F
Super Robot Wars F Final
Super Robot Wars Complete Box
Super Robot Wars Alpha
Super Robot Wars Alpha For Dreamcast
Super Robot Wars Alpha Gaiden
Super Robot Taisen: Original Generation
2nd Super Robot Wars Alpha
Super Robot Taisen: Original Generation 2
3rd Super Robot Wars Alpha: To the End of the Galaxy
Super Robot Wars: Original Generations
Super Robot Wars Original Generation: The Animation
Super Robot Wars Original Generation: Divine Wars
Super Robot Wars Original Generation Gaiden

Gundam series
Gundam Sentinel
Gundam Sentinel 0079 (unofficial series)
Mobile Suit Gundam 0083: Stardust Memory
Mobile Suit Gundam 0083: The Last Blitz of Zeon
Mobile Suit Victory Gundam
Mobile Fighter G Gundam
Mobile Suit Crossbone Gundam
Gundam Fix
Mobile Suit Gundam Wing
Mobile Suit Gundam: The 08th MS Team
New Mobile Report Gundam Wing: Operation Meteor
Gundam Wing: Endless Waltz
Gundam Evolve (Episode 4 and 7)
Superior Defender Gundam Force
Mobile Suit Gundam MS IGLOO
Mobile Suit Gundam Unicorn
Mobile Suit Gundam Hathaway
Master Grade
 RX-78-2 Gundam Ver.Ka
 XXXG-01W Wing Gundam Ver.Ka
 RB-79 Ball Ver.Ka
 XM-X1 Crossbone Gundam X-1 Ver.Ka
 XM-X1 Crossbone Gundam X-2 Ver.Ka
 XM-X1 Crossbone Gundam X-3 Ver.Ka
 RX-0 Unicorn Gundam Ver.Ka
 RX-0 Full Armor Unicorn Gundam Ver.Ka
 MSN-06S Sinanju Ver.Ka
 MSN-06S Sinanju Stein Ver.Ka
 LM312V04 Victory Gundam Ver.Ka
 LM312V04(B-part) + SD-VB03A	Core Booster  Ver.Ka
 LM312V04 V-Dash Gundam Ver.Ka
 RX-93 Nu Gundam Ver.Ka
 MSN-04 Sazabi Ver.Ka
 RX-93-v2 Hi-Nu Gundam Ver.Ka
 FA-78 Full Armor Gundam Ver.Ka
 MS-08R High Mobility Type Zaku II 'Psycho Zaku' Ver.Ka
 MSZ-010 ΖΖ Gundam Ver.Ka
Ka Signature collection in Robot Damashii (Spirits) action figure line
RX-160S Byarlant Custom
MS-05 Zaku I Sniper Yonem Kirks Custom
MSA-005K Guncannon DT (Detector)
AMX-014 Doven Wolf and Doven Wolf Silver Bullet

Virtual On series
Virtual On: Cyber Troopers
Cyber Troopers Virtual-On One Man Rescue
Cyber Troopers Virtual-On Oratorio Tangram
Cyber Troopers Virtual-On One Man Rescue
Cyber Troopers Virtual-On Force
Cyber Troopers Virtual-On Fragmentary Passage
Cyber Troopers Virtual-On Marz

Other works
The Hatsune Miku Robot Suit
Patlabor: The Movie 2
WXIII: Patlabor the Movie 3
Sgt. Frog (manga, anime episode 38 and 73)
Chogekijyouban Kerorogunso 2: Shinkai no Princess dearimasu! (also known as Sgt. Frog The Super Movie 2)
The Cockpit
Xardion
Welcome to the N.H.K. (Episode 24)
Gradius II (manual art for the X68000 version)
Policenauts (designs for the EMPS mecha)
Super Robot Spirit
Real Robots Final Attack
Super Hero Operations
Short Peace (A Farewell to Weapons)
Composite Ver. Ka
 Z-01Z Lancelot Albion Ver.Ka
 Type 0/0A Shinkiro Ver. Ka
 Gurren Lagann Ver.Ka
 Temjin Ver.Ka
 PTX-EX Exbein
Girls und Panzer: This Is the Real Anzio Battle! (storyboards)
Aikatsu! (ep.122 storyboards)
Delicious Party Pretty Cure (ep.5 storyboards)
Encouragement of Climb: Next Summit (ep.3 scenario & storyboards)

He was also involved in the color scheme design of Toyota Team Kraft's SC430 (#35, GT500) which participated in Super GT seasons in 2006 and 2007. His colour scheme was later replaced by Gundam Exia-like colour scheme on July, 2007 (race 5 in 2007 season) as a promotion project of Mobile Suit Gundam 00, one of the most recent Gundam Series.

References 

Sunrise (company) people
Gundam
Mechanical designers (mecha)
1963 births
Living people